Mergellina is a coastal district of the city of Naples, Italy. It is located in the quartiere of Chiaia. It stands at the foot of the Posillipo Hill and faces the Castel dell'Ovo. Some people say the name derives from "mergoglino", a local name for the smew, others believe it is a corruption of "Mare Giallo", which refers to when the sea turned yellow due to floating tufa rock dust following a volcanic eruption many centuries ago. However, very likely the real origin of the name is from Latin "mare ialinum", that stands for clear, transparent sea.

Overview
Historically, it was a small fishing village and port and was quite distinct from Naples, itself. The expansion of Naples to the west under the Spaniards in the 17th century and subsequent development under the Bourbons and then by the national Italian government between 1880 and 1915 gradually led to the incorporation of Mergellina into greater metropolitan Naples.  Today it is still a fishing port but also an important secondary tourist harbor for hydrofoil traffic to the islands in the bay of Naples and to various tourist destinations along the Campanian coast. The port also serves as a mooring for private pleasure craft.

Mergellina was home to the poet Jacopo Sannazaro, whose verses in Italian are part of the body of literature that helped form the Italian language in the Middle Ages. His Latin works, primarily De partu Virginis, though little read today, earned him the nickname of "the Christian Virgil". The main square, one block from the harbor, faces the church of Santa Maria del Parto with his elaborate tomb.

During the 1960 Summer Olympics it was used as Olympic Harbor for the Finn (at Sea Garden) and Flying Dutchman sailboats (at Posillipo). This charming location is famous for being a favourite seashore restaurants' area. At pier, fishermen for years have sold their daily catch.

References 

 
 
 

Zones of Naples